are floors that make a chirping sound when walked upon.  These floors were used in the hallways of some temples and palaces, the most famous example being Nijō Castle, in Kyoto, Japan. Dry boards naturally creak under pressure, but these floors were built in a way that the flooring nails rub against a jacket or clamp, causing chirping noises. It is unclear if the design was intentional. It seems that, at least initially, the effect arose by chance. An information sign in Nijō castle states that "The singing sound is not actually intentional, stemming rather from the movement of nails against clumps in the floor caused by wear and tear over the years". Legend has it that the squeaking floors were used as a security device, assuring that none could sneak through the corridors undetected.

The English name "nightingale" refers to the Japanese bush warbler, or uguisu, which is a common songbird in Japan.

Etymology
 refers to the Japanese bush warbler. Together this means "the sound of a Nightingale from the stretching/swelling/straining [of the floor]".

Construction

The floors were made from dried boards. Upside-down V-shaped joints move within the boards when pressure is applied.

Examples 
The following locations incorporate nightingale floors:
 Nijō Castle, Kyoto
 Chion-in, Kyoto
 Eikan-dō Zenrin-ji, Kyoto
 Daikaku-ji, Kyoto

Modern influences and related topics
 Melody Road in Hokkaido, Wakayama, and Gunma
 Singing Road in Anyanag, Gyeonggi South Korea
 Civic Musical Road in Lancaster, California
 Across the Nightingale Floor, 2002 novel by Lian Hearn

Notes

References
 A-Z Animals. "Uguisi" under "Animals". (2008). accessed November 3, 2012. http://a-z-animals.com/animals/uguisu/.
 Bunt, Jonathan and Gillian Hall, ed. Oxford Beginner's Japanese Dictionary. New York: Oxford University Press, 2000.
 Henshall, Kenneth G. A Guide to Remembering Japanese Characters. Vermont: Tuttle Publishing Company, 1998.
 Japan-guide.com. "Nijo Castle (Nihojo)" under "Kyoto Travel: Nijo Castle" (June 11, 2012). accessed November 3, 2012. http://www.japan-guide.com/e/e3918.html.
 Saiga-Jp.com. "Japanese Kanji Dictionary" under "Japanese Learning" (March 7, 2012). accessed November 4, 2012. https://web.archive.org/web/20101029180930/http://www.saiga-jp.com/kanji_dictionary.html.
 ZenGarden.org. "Nightingale Floor, 'Uguisu-bari' ( 鴬張り )" (2012). accessed September 24, 2012. http://www.zen-garden.org/html/page_nightingalefloor.htm.

External links
 Information, photos and video-clip of Nightingale floors
 Kyoto Travel: Nijo Castle

Floors
Japanese architectural features
Security engineering